Irma Seikkula (14 May 1914 – 8 July 2001) was a Finnish actress. She appeared in 74 films and television shows between 1937 and 1996. She starred in the film Miriam, which was entered into the 8th Berlin International Film Festival.

Selected filmography
 Juha (1937)
 Rikas tyttö (1938)
 Miriam (1957)
 Little Presents (1961)
 The Diary of a Worker (1967)

References

External links

1914 births
2001 deaths
Actresses from Helsinki
People from Uusimaa Province (Grand Duchy of Finland)
Finnish film actresses
Finnish television actresses